An electronic license plate  (also referred to as a digital display license plate or simply digital license plate) is a vehicle-mounted identification device that emits a radio signal for tracking and digital monitoring purposes. Various patents including advanced features have been published with the intention of replacing traditional metal and plastic license plates. It communicates directly with the vehicle computer system as well as other remote systems related to vehicle regulation.

History and Conception 
Inventor Dean L. Naddeo published a patent on June 11, 2002, for the improvement of existing license plates. Naddeo's intention was to maximize the capabilities of traditional license plates. Electronic license plates are claimed to be more efficient in lowering crime, cost, and replacing other forms of identification through the introduction of electronic monitoring.

Design 

The display is powered directly from the vehicle's power system and can communicate with the vehicle's on-board computer.

Components 
 Central processing unit  - gathers and sends out information to external sources; sends information for display on the license plate's screen
 Storage and Identifying key - integrated circuit; stores information (e.g., vehicle registration, identification numbers, state of issue, expiration date) and restrictions, as well as a corresponding key to prevent electronic tampering.
 Disabling units - sensor; if tampering is detected, sends a signal to the central computer system and ignition disrupter to disable the vehicle electronic component does not allow vehicle to be turned on when tampering is detected.
 Display - backlit screen, capable of displaying license plate number, state of issue, expiration date, etc.

Features 

Electronic license plates can be equipped with additional features beyond the basic purpose of identification. They could, for example, deliver information and be used for prepaid service.

Information 
To uphold privacy regulations, access to electronic license plates should be regulated. Complex information such as speed and position can be accessed remotely which would be useful for patrolling highways, reducing speed violations, and raising road safety. Simple information such as the vehicle identification number (VIN), registration expiration date, proof of insurance, and legal ownership records could be displayed digitally on the plate's screen or viewed using a remote device.

Prepaid services 
Electronic license plates allow certain transportation-related fees and services to be prepaid digitally and updated automatically. Possible fees that could be automatically paid include Vehicle registration renewal, tolls, and parking permits.

Security 
In situations such as a police chase or car accident, the plate could emit a signal of collision or crime, directly identifying the vehicle's involvement. If not identified at the scene, the license plate holds the information in memory and displays a digital alert. The technology in electronic license plates could allow security cameras to automatically receive a clearer image.

Privacy 

Privacy concerns are a major reason electronic license plates are not yet in public use. Since hacking and identity fraud are potential risks, in-depth testing and development of data security is required.  In accordance with consumer privacy laws, information from the electronic license plate will be sent out only when the vehicle is involved with any violations or illegal activities. The device is now made with tamper-resistant hardware to prevent information from being acquired by unauthorized parties. The vehicle can be disabled automatically if any tampering is sensed. For example, the unauthorized removal of its electronic license plate will disable the vehicle, reducing vehicle-identity theft, or the plate could be programmed to detect tampering aimed at avoiding payments or as part of another crime, and report such actions.

Criticisms of Electronic License Plates

Price and Practicality

One common criticism of Electronic License Plates is the high price of such devices, with Tom Nardi of Hackaday stating "The question of whether or not the average car owner is willing to pay $800 to avoid the DMV is one we can’t really answer".

Security and Privacy 

Another criticism of electronic license plates is the ability for third parties to disable their vehicle or display messages on their license plate without their permission, and the device constantly uploading GPS data.

Technical Issues and Legality 

One obvious criticism of electronic license plates is that, as they are computer systems, they are inherently prone to technical glitches and issues. A example would be popular car YouTuber Doug DeMuro commenting on how a license plate was downloading a software update. Another issue is that primary manufacturer RPlate prevents their customer from opening it, preventing any repairs such as a broken screen from being performed by the user.

The practicality of installing such plates is also debated, as of 2023 only a select few states have allowed these devices.

Adoption in the U.S. 

Three states in the US are exploring improvements over traditional license plates. The governor of California has set up California's Electronic License Plate Pilot Program, which will test such alternatives. In 2017, California expected to issue electronic license plates to a limited number of volunteers to test this new technology. The main reason for California's interest in electronic license plates is to reduce taxpayers' expense, and are projected to reduce $20 million spent by the Department of Motor Vehicles.

After successful rollout in California and Arizona, Michigan has legalized digital license plates. Legislation in Florida regarding allowing digital license plates has been considered but ultimately was not passed.

In 2022, there is currently one vendor of electronic license plates in the United States. California-based Reviver is the sole supplier of electronic license plates for the states of Arizona, California, Michigan, and Texas (commercial fleet vehicles only).

References

Vehicle registration plates